Rashid Gayle (born April 16, 1974) is a former American football defensive back. He played for the Jacksonville Jaguars and the Tampa Bay Buccaneers in 1996, the BC Lions from 1997 to 1998 and for the Winnipeg Blue Bombers from 1999 to 2000.

References

1974 births
Living people
American football defensive backs
Boise State Broncos football players
Jacksonville Jaguars players
BC Lions players
Winnipeg Blue Bombers players
American expatriate sportspeople in Canada
Sportspeople from Manhattan
Players of American football from New York City
Players of American football from California
Sportspeople from Roseville, California
American players of Canadian football